Kendrick Lee Yen Hui (born 8 October 1984) is a Singaporean former badminton player. Lee was ranked fourteen, his highest ranking, in 2007. He was a two-time national champion.

Career 
Lee was a two-time men's singles national champion of 2000 and 2005. He was the youngest to ever win the title when he won his first, at the age of 15.

Lee was the silver medalists at the 2002 World Junior Championships, became the first Singaporean to reach the World Junior finals. He competed at the 2002 Commonwealth Games in Manchester, and was part of the team that clinched the silver medal. In 2003, he finished as the semi-finalists at the Polish International and Malaysia Satellite tournament.

Lee won his first senior international title at the 2004 Mauritius International in the mixed doubles event partnered with Li Yujia. After that, he won the singles event at the Smiling Fish and Cheers Asian Satellite tournament.

In 2006, he competed at the Commonwealth and Asian Games. During the 2006 Bitburger Luxembourg Open, Lee managed to clinch the runner-up position, losing to compatriot Ronald Susilo. Notable achievements include the semi-final appearance in the 2006 Chinese Taipei Open after defeating China's Chen Hong.

In October 2007, he managed to end his 3-year drought by claiming the Dutch Open men's single's crown, beat Poland's Przemyslaw Wacha in the final. At the 24th SEA Games held in Nakhon Ratchasima, Thailand, he was the national flag-bearer. He was quoted as saying that it's an honour he does not take lightly. Compiled with the recent win in the Netherlands, it gave him more motivation to do well. Kendrick defeating World no.6 Sony Dwi Kuncoro in the first round. He went on to beat Kuan Beng Hong in the quarter-finals. In the semi-finals, he once again took everyone by disposing of Thai favourite, Boonsak Ponsana, in 2 straight sets on Boonsak's homesoil. He made history for being the first Singaporean to feature in the finals of the men's singles event after 24 years. However, he lost to reigning Olympic champion Taufik Hidayat in the finals, adding another silver medal to the silver medal he has already gotten earlier for the men's team event.

Awards 
Lee received the 2005 Meritorious Award from the Singapore National Olympic Committee.

Lee was named as 2007 Singapore Sports Idol along with 21 Singaporean athletes.

Achievements

Southeast Asian Games 
Men's singles

World Junior Championships 
Boys' singles

BWF Grand Prix 
The BWF Grand Prix had two levels, the Grand Prix and Grand Prix Gold. It was a series of badminton tournaments sanctioned by the Badminton World Federation (BWF) and played between 2007 and 2017. The World Badminton Grand Prix was sanctioned by the International Badminton Federation from 1983 to 2006.

Men's singles

  BWF Grand Prix Gold tournament
  BWF/IBF Grand Prix tournament

BWF International Challenge/Series/Satellite 
Men's singles

Mixed doubles

  BWF International Challenge tournament
  BWF International Series/IBF Satellite tournament

References 

1984 births
Living people
Singaporean male badminton players
Singaporean people of Chinese descent
Catholic High School, Singapore alumni
Badminton players at the 2002 Commonwealth Games
Badminton players at the 2006 Commonwealth Games
Commonwealth Games silver medallists for Singapore
Commonwealth Games medallists in badminton
Badminton players at the 2006 Asian Games
Asian Games competitors for Singapore
Competitors at the 1999 Southeast Asian Games
Competitors at the 2003 Southeast Asian Games
Competitors at the 2005 Southeast Asian Games
Competitors at the 2007 Southeast Asian Games
Southeast Asian Games silver medalists for Singapore
Southeast Asian Games bronze medalists for Singapore
Southeast Asian Games medalists in badminton
Medallists at the 2002 Commonwealth Games